Buckwild Presents EP is a limited EP by Buckwild, following on the heels of his collaboration with Celph Titled, Nineteen Ninety Now. The EP was also released via No Sleep Recordings and is limited to 200 copies.

The A-side features further collaborations with Celph Titled and out-takes from Nineteen Ninety Now while the B-side collects previously unreleased or very rare remixes from the mid- to late 1990s.

Side A: Buckwild Meets Celph Titled
"There Will Be Blood (LP Version)" (Ft. Sadat X, Diamond D, Grand Puba, O.C. & AG)
"There Will Be Blood (Remix)" (Ft. Sadat X, Diamond D, Grand Puba, O.C. & A.G.)
"Nothin' To Say" (Ft. Rise)
"The Celph Titled Show"

Side B: Rare & Unreleased Remixes
"Fast Life (Remix)" (Kool G Rap & Nas)
"We Run Things (Remix)" (Da Bush Babees)
"Next Level (Remix)" (Tha Alkaholiks & Diamond D)
"Beware Of The Rampsack (Remix)" (Rampage)
"Represent (Remix)" (Grand Daddy I.U.)

References

2010 EPs
Albums produced by Buckwild
Hip hop EPs